Oued El Abtal District is a district of Mascara Province, Algeria.

Municipalities
The district is further divided into 3 municipalities:
Oued El Abtal
Aïn Ferah
Sidi Abdeldjebar

Districts of Mascara Province